Australovuilleminia is a genus of fungus in the family Vuilleminiaceae. The monotypic genus was described in 2010 to contain the corticioid species Australovuilleminia coccinea from New Zealand, formerly misdetermined as Vuilleminia comedens.

References

External links
 

Corticiales
Monotypic Basidiomycota genera
Fungi of New Zealand